CinéGroupe was a Canadian animation studio based in Montreal, Quebec. The company was founded in 1974. Its shows and films have been seen in over 125 countries.

Notable franchises from CinéGroupe include: What's with Andy?, The Kids from Room 402, and Pig City (all aired on  Fox Family, now known as Freeform); the computer-animated Tripping the Rift (Sci Fi, now known as Syfy); and PBS' Sagwa, the Chinese Siamese Cat. With Sony Wonder, it has produced Mega Babies (also aired on Fox Family), as well as a direct-to-video feature, Lion of Oz (a prequel to both the L. Frank Baum work, and the 1939 movie).
In the 2000s, the company produced the animation for a sequel to the 1981 cult classic Heavy Metal for Columbia TriStar Home Video titled Heavy Metal 2000, premiered on Starz in the United States and on Teletoon in Canada from 2001 onwards. In 2004, it made Pinocchio 3000, a sci-fi retelling of the Italian tale. Galidor, a live-action fantasy series for teenagers, has also been produced by the company. The company also cooperated with the toy maker MGA Entertainment in the creation of Bratz: Starrin' and Stylin''', a 2D-animated direct-to-video film based on MGA's Bratz line of fashion dolls.

History

In August 1998, it was announced that ABC Family Worldwide would purchase a 20% minority stake in the company.

In July 2001, Lions Gate's ownership of the studio was confirmed to have been reduced to 30%, with Lions Gate president Andre Link having 50% of its voting stock, leading to the studio being a partner of Lions Gate instead of a subsidiary. In September 2001, the company formed a division called CinéGroupe Image to expand to live-action programming. By December 2003, the stake was reduced further to 29.4%.

In October 2002, the company united with the music label Les Disques Star Records Inc. to create a home video distributor called CinéGroupe Star. The partnership ended in January 2004. In November 2002, the company announced they would produce a Britney Spears cartoon.

In January 2004, CinéGroupe filed for protection order from its creditors with the Quebec Superior Court.

CinéGroupe is currently co-producing Tshakapesh, a 2D-animated series based on an Innu legend, which has aired on APTN and Radio-Canada since Fall 2018. Two edutainment IPs are currently being developed by CinéGroupe, aiming at raising awareness about water preservation and environmental protection. CinéGroupe is also viewing revivals and revitalization of their old properties.

CinéGroupe is currently partnered with HG Distribution (Henry Gagnon Distribution) for the distribution of its library. However, only a portion of CinéGroupe's catalogue is listed for distribution by HG. Several notable titles such as Bad Dog, Daft Planet, and The Tofus are not listed, as are live-action series, such as Big Wolf on Campus.

Library
SeriesOvide and the Gang (1987–1989, co-production with Odec Kid Cartoons)Sharky & George (1990–1992, co-production with Label 35)The Little Flying Bears (1990–1991, co-production with Zagreb Film)Spirou (1992)Zoe and Charlie (1993, co-production with Tele Images)Sea Dogs: Adventures on the Seven Seas (1995)The Magical Adventures of Quasimodo (1996, co-production with Tele Images and Astral Media)Princess Sissi (1997–1998, co-production with Saban Entertainment and Saban International Paris)Bad Dog (1998–2000, co-production with Saban Entertainment)Kit and Kaboodle (1998, co-production with Cambum and One Entertainment)Team SOS (1998, co-production with Ravensburger Film + TV)The Secret World of Santa Claus (1998, Co-production with Marathon Media)Mega Babies (1999–2000, co-production with Landmark Entertainment Group and Sony Wonder)Big Wolf on Campus (1999–2002, co-production with Saban Entertainment)The Kids from Room 402 (2000–2001, co-production with Saban Entertainment)Wunschpunsch (2000, co-production with Saban Entertainment and Saban International Paris)Jim Button (2000–2001, co-production with Saban Entertainment. Saban International Paris, ARD/DEGETO and EM.TV)What's with Andy? (2001–2007, co-production with Saban Entertainment) and SIP Animation (season 2))Sagwa, the Chinese Siamese Cat (2001–2002, co-production with Sesame Workshop and Industrial FX Productions)Edward (2002)Pig City (2002–2004)Galidor (2002, co-production with Tom Lynch Company and The Lego Group)Daft Planet (2002)Seriously Weird (2002, co-production with Granada Kids)Tripping the Rift (2004–2007, co-production with Film Roman)11 Somerset (2004, co-production with Télé-Québec)The Tofus (2004–2005, co-production with SIP Animation)Charlie Jade (2005)Tshakapesh (2018)Splish SplashSharky & GeorgeFilmsHeavy Metal 2000 (2000, distributed by Columbia Tristar Home Video)Lion of Oz (2000, distributed by Sony Wonder)Bratz: Starrin' & Stylin' (2004, co-production with MGA Entertainment and Toon City Animation, distributed by 20th Century Fox Home Entertainment)Pinocchio 3000 (2004, co-production with Filmax and Anima Kids, Distributed by Christal Films)

TV specialsDavid Copperfield (1993)L'oeil du loup (1998)

Video games
In 2002 and 2003, CinéGroupe developed three video games for the Game Boy Advance.Tom and Jerry in Infurnal Escape (2002, published by NewKidCo)Dora the Explorer: The Search for Pirate Pig's Treasure (2002, published by NewKidCo)Dora the Explorer: Super Spies'' (2003, published by Gotham Games)

References

Canadian animation studios
Companies based in Montreal
Canadian companies established in 1974
Mass media companies established in 1974
Television production companies of Canada
1974 establishments in Quebec
Former Lionsgate subsidiaries